Jyväskylä is a city and municipality in Finland in the western part of the Finnish Lakeland. It is located about 150 km north-east from Tampere, the third largest city in Finland; and about 270 km north from Helsinki, the capital of Finland. The Jyväskylä sub-region includes Jyväskylä, Hankasalmi, Laukaa, Petäjävesi, Toivakka, and Uurainen. Other border municipalities of Jyväskylä are Joutsa, Jämsä and Luhanka.

The city has been one of the fastest-growing cities in Finland during the 20th century,
when in 1940, there were only 8,000 inhabitants in Jyväskylä.

Elias Lönnrot, the compiler of the Finnish national epic, the Kalevala, gave the city the nickname "Athens of Finland". This nickname refers to the major role of Jyväskylä as an educational centre. The works of the notable Finnish architect, Alvar Aalto, can be seen throughout the city. The city hosts the Rally Finland, which is part of the World Rally Championship. It is also home of the annual Jyväskylä Arts Festival.

Etymology
The second part of the city's name, kylä, means village. The first part of the city's name, jyväs-, looks like the stem of an adjective *jyvänen, derived from jyvä, "grain" (compare Wiktionary). Alternatively, it has been associated with Taxus, a genus of yews, and the Old Prussian word juwis. It has also been speculated that the word jyväs refers to the sun's reflection of the surface of the water.

Erkki Fredrikson, the curator of the Museum of Central Finland, put forward a theory related to the name, that the origin word for the city's name was syväs and not jyväs, and that the name was once derived from Jyväsjoki (literally the "grain river"), which, according to Fredrikson's assumption, was actually called Syväsjoki (literally the "deep river"). However, the name Jyväsjoki was registered in 1506 for the region's first known resident, Heikki Ihanninpoika Jyväsjoki. His house was located at the mouth of the Äijälänjoki River, which in Fredrikson's opinion also supports the Syväsjoki theory. The village, known at the beginning as Jyväsjoki village, gradually transformed into Jyväskylä.

History

In the Jyväskylä region, there are archeological findings from the Stone Age. According to the oldest available taxation documents (maakirja), there were seven estates on the Jyväskylä region in 1539. One of them, the estate of Mattila, alone possessed the areas stretching from the village of Keljo to the villages of Vesanka and Palokka. The oldest estate in Jyväskylä continuously held by the same family is the estate of Lahti, which emerged when the estate of Mattila was split between two brothers in 1600. The history of the estate of Lahti and the family of Lahti have had a significant impact on the development of Jyväskylä region. Lahdenrinne, in the south-west corner of Jyväsjärvi lake, belongs to the old heartland of the estate of Lahti.

The name Jyväskylä was mentioned in 1575 as Jyueskylä. Its name is derived from the lake Jyväsjärvi. A shorter form of the name, Jyväs (written Jyuexe) was mentioned slightly earlier in 1565 and again (this time written Jyues) in 1570.

The City of Jyväskylä was founded on 22 March 1837, when Emperor of Russia and Grand Duke of Finland, Nicholas I of Russia, signed the charter of the city and the infrastructure was essentially built from scratch; before that, Jyväskylä was a village belonging to the larger rural municipality of Laukaa, being the largest village of the whole parish. At the times Finnish military battalion Suomen kaarti participated under his rule in military operations against the Polish November Uprising and later in Hungary, Turkey and Bessarabia (today Moldova). While Nicholas I of Russia abolished many autonomous areas, it has been argued, that the loyalty of Finnish military influenced his approach towards Finnish autonomy.  The original town was built between Lake Jyväsjärvi (which is connected to Lake Päijänne) and the Jyväskylä ridge (Harju), and consisted of most of the current grid-style city centre.

The establishment of schools in the 1850s and '60s proved to be the most significant step in regards to the later development of Jyväskylä. The first three Finnish-speaking schools in the world were founded in Jyväskylä, the lycée in 1858, the teachers’ college in 1863, and the girls’ school in 1864. Well-trained teaching staff and pupils from different parts of the country changed the atmosphere of Jyväskylä irrevocably.

In the early 20th century, the town expanded several times. Most of today's Jyväskylä was built after the Continuation War, when refugees from Karelia and other parts of the country moved to the city, and housing was badly needed. During the 21st century Jyväskylä has grown fast – by over 1,000 inhabitants every year.

Säynätsalo was consolidated with Jyväskylä in 1993, and Jyväskylän maalaiskunta and Korpilahti, for their part, on January 1, 2009.

Geography

The hilly and forested terrain in Jyväskylä is surrounded by hundreds of lakes. To reach Jyväskylä from the east, one needs to go through or pass the hill Kanavuori, which used to host a military depot full of ammunition and armaments.

Jyväskylä is located in the Finnish Lakeland. There are 328 lakes in the city, and lakes and rivers constitute 20,1% (295 km2) of the total area of the city. The city's largest lakes are Päijänne, Leppävesi, Tuomiojärvi, Palokkajärvi, Luonetjärvi, and Alvajärvi-Korttajärvi. The city center is located on the shores of a small Jyväsjärvi.

The landscape in Jyväskylä is hilly, forested and full of waters. The architect Alvar Aalto compared the hilly landscape of Jyväskylä to Toscana in Italy: "The slope of Jyväskylä ridge is almost like the mountain vineyards of Fiesole".

Climate
The defined climate is a subarctic continental (Köppen: Dfc). Because of its northern location, winters are long, snowy, cold, and dark. During midwinter, the city receives daylight for only around five hours. Summers are mild, with the average daily maximum temperature being  in July. During the summer, Jyväskylä experiences long daylight and white nights i.e. midnight twilight.

Demographics

Population
Jyväskylä was the fastest growing Finnish city in the 20th century. The population has continued to grow rapidly in the 21st century.

Languages
96.7% of the population spoke Finnish as their first language in 2010. The share of Swedish speakers was 0.2%. Other languages made up the remaining 3% of the population.

Migration
In year 2019, there were about 7,650 foreigners in Jyväskylä.

Military
Jyväskylä hosts the headquarters of the Finnish Air Force, in Tikkakoski. As a central location, it has traditionally been important base for military operations. Jyväskylä became known as major firearms manufacturer (Tikkakoski) during the world wars, producing machine guns and ammunition.

According to reporting in Helsingin Sanomat, since the 1990s Jyväskylä has served as a signals intelligence collection site, primarily targeting military maneuvers around St. Petersburg.

Economy

Because of excellent connections, Jyväskylä was a busy marketplace even before the first permanent settlements were founded in the current city centre. The establishment of Finland's first three Finnish-speaking schools: the lycée in 1858, the teachers’ college in 1863, and the girls’ school in 1864 proved to be the most significant steps in regards to later development of Jyväskylä. Educational services became the heart of the economic growth of the city. In 1912 Wilhelm Schauman founded a plywood mill on the shores of Jyväsjärvi. Soon other kinds of forest based businesses opened factories and premises in the city. Thus, lumber, pulp, and paper became the second stronghold of the economy in Jyväskylä. Later, the high quality education and paper machinery industry tempted information technology businesses to settle in the city.

Nowadays, the main sources of subsistence in Jyväskylä are educational and health care services, paper machinery production, information technology, and renewable energy. The most important private employers are paper machinery producer Metso ltd., retail trade company Keskimaa Cooperative Society, real estate service company ISS, and wind turbine gear manufacturer Moventas. The biggest public employers are the City of Jyväskylä, the Central Finland Health Care District, the University of Jyväskylä, and the Air Force Academy.

, only 1% of the labor force works on the primary sector, 21% on the secondary sector, and 78% on the service sector of the economy.

In April 2012, the unemployment rate in Jyväskylä was 12.2%, which was higher than average in Finland (9.8% in 1/2012). As of July 2012, there are about 61,000 jobs in Jyväskylä. The average income per income earner was €24,380 in 2010.

In 2011, Jyväskylä topped in an image evaluation study among businesses. The city reached the highest score of large Finnish cities in the study, succeeding especially in the availability of skilled work force, on commercial services, on transport connections, and on geographical location.

The Gross domestic product per capita in the city of Jyväskylä was €33,688 in 2005. The self-sufficiency in workplaces exceeded 100% in the city, raising the GDP per capita higher than the national average. The GDP per capita of the whole Jyväskylä region was €28,718 in 2007. The regional GDP per capita is lower than the Finnish national average, mainly due to high number of students and a relatively high unemployment rate.

Culture

Museums
The Alvar Aalto Museum and the Museum of Central Finland form a center of culture in the immediate vicinity of the historical campus of the University of Jyväskylä. Both museums are designed by functionalist Alvar Aalto. The Alvar Aalto Museum displays the artist's most important work and design. The Museum of Central Finland specializes in cultural history. It serves both as the town museum of Jyväskylä and the provincial museum of Central Finland. In summer 2015 Alvar Aalto Foundation and the city of Jyväskylä launched an architect competition to connect the two museums.

One of architect Aalto's most significant works, Säynätsalo Town Hall, is located in Säynätsalo island.

The city hosts the Craft Museum of Finland, which presents a range of different handicraft techniques from across the country, as well as a centre dedicated to the conservation of textiles that serves private customers, museums and organisations. The National Costume Center of Finland forms a part of the museum.

The Aviation Museum of Central Finland near the Jyväskylä Airport in Tikkakoski exhibits the aviation history of Finland.

The University of Jyväskylä Museum is specialized in the history of the University and diversity of nature in Central Finland.

Jyväskylä Art Museum, located the city centre is the regional art museum of Central Finland. In collaboration with the Centre for Creative Photography, the Jyväskylä Art Museum maintains The Ratamo Printmaking and Photography Centre. This centre consists of the Galleria Ratamo along with a printmaking workshop, photography studio and artist workspaces all situated in Jyväskylä's former roundhouse.

In addition, historical churches in the city are open for public, most notables of them being the Taulumäki Church and the Jyväskylä City Church.

Theaters
The biggest theater in the city is the Jyväskylä City Theatre, designed by Alvar Aalto. It stands right in the center of the city.

In addition to the City Theatre, more than dozen amateur drama companies serve audiences of all ages. The most popular theatres include:
 Huoneteatteri (The Room Theatre), Sammonkatu 4
 Jyväskylä University Student Theatre, Student Union Building, Keskussairaalantie 2
 Jyväskylän kansannäyttämö, Sammonkatu 7
 AdAstra Theatre, Koskenharjuntie 8
 Teatterikone, Köhniönkatu 31
 Jyväskylän teatteriyhdistys Kulissi, Siltakatu 25
 Improvisaatioteatteri Ässiä Hatusta, University Campus, Student Union Building, Keskussairaalantie 2

Music
In the 2010s, Jyväskylä earned a reputation as one of the most productive and high-quality rap music centers, and Jyväskylä has been titled in the media as the "capital of Finnish rap". Gettomasa, among others, the rap artists from Jyväskylä who deserved their encouragement.

Annual events

 Arctic and Fabulous Film Festival offers different forms and genres of Nordic film in the middle of most freezing winter season in February.
 Jyväskylä City's Birthday Week (last week of March) offers a number of concerts, theatre, exhibitions and debates around the city.
 Jyrock in April is an indie and alternative rock and pop festival.
 Lutakko liekeissä in August is a rock festival held in rock club Tanssisali Lutakko.
 Yläkaupungin Yö in May is one of the biggest annual street festivals of the city.
 Sataman Yö is an annual pop music festival organised one week before the midsummer in the harbour of Jyväskylä.
 Jyväskylä Arts Festival in the middle of July accommodates musicians, bands, contemporary circus, comedians, mimes, physical theatre, storytellers and film makers. It is one of the most well known festivals in Finland.
 Neste Oil Rally Finland in the end of July is the biggest annually organised event in Nordic countries and a part of the WRC World Rally Championships.
 Athenis Finlandiae organised in August is a cultural festival combining elements from ancient history, arts and science.
 Finlandia Marathon in the beginning of September is a marathon festival designed for everybody from a top athlete to an amateur jogger. Time of Dance – the largest annual festival of Finnish contemporary dance is taking place in the end of September.
 The International Print Triennial Graphica Creativa is organised every three years since 1975. It was the very first international graphic art exhibition in Finland. The latest triennial was organised in 2012.

Sports

The University of Jyväskylä is the only university in Northern Europe with a faculty of sports. The faculty has been a key player to develop a strong sports culture in the city, which is why Jyväskylä is also dubbed the "capital of Finnish sport".

The city hosts the Neste Oil Rally Finland (formerly known as the 1000 Lakes Rally). It is the biggest annually organised public event in the Nordic countries, gathering over 500,000 spectators every year. The rally has been held since 1951, first as a national competition, then from 1959 on as a European Rally Championship event and since the introduction of the World Rally Championship in 1973, as Finland's WRC event.

Ice hockey venue Synergia-areena, Hippos Finnish baseball stadium, swimming hall AaltoAlvari, and many other primary sport venues of the city are located in Hippos, two kilometres away from the city centre. The Matti Nykänen ski jumping hill is located next to the Laajavuori ski resort just few kilometres west from the city centre. The main football stadium lies on the slopes of Harju just next to the city centre. The Killeri hippodrome on the western parts of the city serves different horse racing competitions.

The inventor of Finnish national sport pesäpallo, Lauri "Tahko" Pihkala, studied and lived in Jyväskylä. The Upper secondary school of Jyväskylän Lyseo hosted the historic event of first pesäpallo match in world in September 1920.

Sports teams from Jyväskylä include:
JYP plays in the top-tier Finnish men's ice hockey league, SM-liiga. The team was the 2009 and 2012 Finnish Champion. The team also won the European Trophy in 2013 and the European Champions Hockey League tournament in 2018.
JYP Naiset is a three-time Finnish Champion of the Naisten Liiga, the top-tier Finnish women’s ice hockey league. As of 2021, the team plays in the second-tier Naisten Mestis.
JyPK (Jyväskylän Pallokerho) plays in the Kansallinen Liiga, the premier division of Finnish women’s football.
FC Vaajakoski plays in Kakkonen, the third tier of the men’s Finnish football league system.
FC Blackbird and Jyväskylän Jalkapalloklubi (JJK Jyväskylä) play in Kolmonen, the fourth tier of the men’s Finnish football league system. JJK played in the premier division Veikkausliiga in 2017.
Jyväskylän Seudun Palloseura (JPS) plays in the highest bandy division, Bandyliiga, and won the Finnish Championship for the first time in 2019. Their home arena is the Vehkalammen kenttä.
Jyväskylä Track and Field Club (JKU) is one of the leading track and field clubs in Finland.
Jyväskylän Kiri is the most successful men’s pesäpallo team in history. Currently they play in the top division Superpesis.
Jyväskylän Saukot plays in the Finnish men’s women’s water polo top division.
Kampuksen Dynamo (KaDy) plays futsal in the Finnish top league.
Kirittäret holds fourteen Finnish Championships in women's pesäpallo and plays in the Superpesis.
Jyväskylän seudun Jaguaarit plays in the Finnish third-tier American football league, the Amerikkalaisen jalkapallon II-divisioona (2nd Division).
Happee plays in the top-tier Finnish floorball leagues, the men's F-liiga and women's F-liiga. Men's Finnish Championship in 2014.
Hongikon Nuorisoseuran Urheilijat (HoNsU) plays basketball in the Naisten Korisliiga, the top-tier women’s league, and the men’s Koripallon I-divisioona, the second-tier men’s league.
Jyväskylä Freestyle Club is the main freestyle skiing club.
Jyväskylä Ski Club (JHS) is one of the most well known cross-country skiing, ski jumping, alpine skiing, snowboarding, Nordic combined, and biathlon clubs in Finland.
Meloiloa Canoe Club plays canoe polo and practices whitewater slalom, canoe racing, wildwater canoeing and marathon kayaking.
Jyväskylä Rugby Club plays rugby union (rugby) in the Finnish Championship League; former national champions.
Jyväskylän Fight Club is the city's most successful martial arts and Brazilian Jiu-Jitsu academy.
Jigotai is the largest martial arts club in Central Finland (judo, karate, kickboxing, t'ai chi, aikido, taido, etc.)
Mukwan is a well-known Taekwondo and martial arts club in Jyväskylä since 1984.
Liikunnan Riemu plays futsal in the Finnish top league, the Futsal-Liiga, since 2013.
Jyväskylän Liitokiekkoilijat Ry (JyLi Ry) competes in Ultimate, Disc golf and other disc sports.
Jaguars Spirit Athletes (JSA) is the primary cheerleading club.
Toyota Gazoo Racing WRT, the official Toyota world rally team run by 4-time world champion and Jyväskylä native Tommi Mäkinen.
The city hosted the 2006 FIBA Europe Under-16 Championship for Women Division B.

Government 

The city council of Jyväskylä is the main decision making body at the local level. Its 75 members are elected every fourth year in municipal elections. The city council elects the mayor. The current mayor is Timo Koivisto.

Seat distribution in the city council

The prevalence of the social democratic party can be explained in part by the Vaajakoski, a major industrial center historically that is currently part of Jyväskylä, and its heritage of industrial workers voting social democrats.

Jyväskylä was the only place during the 2017 municipal elections where the Green League was the largest party.

Administrative division 

The city of Jyväskylä is divided into fourteen wards, which are further divided into 89 districts. The ward division does not always follow district boundaries.

The following is a listing of the 14 wards of Jyväskylä by population, as of November 2010
 Kantakaupunki (city centre), population 25,149
 Kuokkala, population 16,904
 Vaajakoski-Jyskä, population 14,588
 Palokka-Puuppola, population 14,395
 Kypärämäki-Kortepohja, population 10,537
 Huhtasuo, population 8,691
 Keltinmäki-Myllyjärvi, population 7,524
 Keljo, population 5,494
 Halssila, population 5,479
 Tikkakoski-Nyrölä, population 5,401
 Korpilahti, population 4,993
 Lohikoski-Seppälänkangas, population 4,650
 Säynätsalo, population 3,340
 Kuohu-Vesanka, population 2,118

Former city managers
 Varma T. Suosalmi 1930–1935 
 Arvo Haapasalo 1935–1955
 Jorma Tuominen 1955–1959
 Veli Järvinen 1959–1974 
 Jaakko Loven 1975–1994
 Pekka Kettunen  1994–2004
 Markku Andersson  2004–2015

Cityscape

Jyväskylä was founded in the northern end of the lake Päijänne at the crossroads of three major waterways. Lakes control the cityscape. The city grid plan from 1833 by Jacob Leonard Boringh can be well recognised in the city center. Nevertheless, due to very rapid population growth, the cityscape has gone through one of the most massive changes in all of Finland.

Nowadays, Jyväskylä is a city of modern architecture. The city has more buildings designed by one of the best known international functionalist architects Alvar Aalto than any other city in the world.

The establishment of schools in the 1850s and 1860s proved to be the most important step from the point of view of the later development of Jyväskylä. The headquarters of the University of Jyväskylä are considered to be Aalto's masterpieces. Later, a modern architect Arto Sipinen, a pupil of Aalto, has influenced the cityscape since the 1970s by designing most of the new university buildings in the city.

The outskirts of the city are mainly populated by student apartments and single-family houses. Some of the most important buildings, like Säynätsalo Town Hall, designed by Aalto are located outside the city centre in Säynätsalo and Muuratsalo.

Consolidated areas Korpilahti, Jyväskylän maalaiskunta, Säynätsalo and also western parts of Jyväskylä are mainly countryside dominated by hilly forests and lakes.

Transport

Jyväskylä railway station is served by VR direct trains to Helsinki, Pieksämäki, Tampere, Turku, Vaasa and many other destinations in Finland. The station was extensively modernised in 2002.

It has regular direct flights to Helsinki Airport. The airport serves also as a military and charter airport.

The city is on crossroads of many main roads of Finland. Highway 4 (E75) passes the city from south to north, and Highway 9 (E63) from southeast to northwest. Highway 23 between Pori and Joensuu also runs through Jyväskylä.

Jyväskylä harbour is home to many passenger ships operating on lake Päijänne. During summer time, there are direct ship connections to Lahti, Jämsä, Suolahti, Viitasaari, and some other cities.

The public transportation system of Jyväskylä is managed by the city under the Linkki brand and operated under contract to the city by Jyväskylän liikenne, Länsilinjat and Mennään Bussilla. It is based on bus lines.

Education

Jyväskylä is a traditional centre of education. Including school children, and the students in high schools, vocational schools, the university of applied sciences, and the universities, the number of students and pupils in the city reaches 45,000, boosting Jyväskylä's reputation as a "student city". Over 30% of the city population are students. A number of firsts in Finnish education have taken place in Jyväskylä:
 Jyväskylä Lyceum (Finnish: Jyväskylän Lyseon lukio) is the world's first junior secondary school with Finnish as the language of instruction. It started its first term on 1 October 1858 and turned 160 years old in 2018. Lyceum still exists and is one of the three upper secondary schools in the city.
 The first Finnish-medium teacher training college (1863)
 The first Finnish-medium school for girls (1864)
 Finland's first Summer University (1912)

Due to this, among other things, the city has earned the nickname Athens of Finland. The teacher training college later evolved into the College of Education (1934) and further into the multidisciplinary University of Jyväskylä (1966).

The University of Jyväskylä is one of the most popular universities in Finland. Almost 16,000 students are enrolled to study for a bachelor's or master's degree, and the university also offers PhD programs in most of its subjects.  Historically, the university has excelled in the study of education, but in the last few decades it has also gained respect in the sciences.  It is the only university in Finland offering university-level education in sports, training sports teachers and coaches. Today the University offers also Cyber Security degrees, in close co-operation with the Finnish Defence Forces. According to the Ministry of Employment and the Economy the city has been acknowledged in 2013 as the Cyber Security City, providing a portfolio of Cyber Security related studies and activities.

JAMK University of Applied Sciences has 8.000 students. It has four different units: School of Business and Services Management, School of Health and Social Studies, School of Technology and Teacher Education College. HUMAK University of Applied Sciences educates cultural management in Jyväskylä.

Notable people

International relations

Twin towns — Sister cities — Friendship cities
Jyväskylä is a member city of Eurotowns network and is twinned with:

See also
 Asteroid 1500 Jyväskylä (named after the town by its Finnish discoverer, Yrjö Väisälä).
 Nokkakivi Amusement Park
 St. Olaf's Church, Jyväskylä
 Vaajakoski Motorway

References

Further reading 
 History

External links

City of Jyväskylä  – International version of the official website
Map of Jyväskylä 
Region of Jyväskylä Tourist Information 

 
Grand Duchy of Finland
Populated lakeshore places in Finland
Inland port cities and towns in Finland
Rally Finland
1837 establishments in the Russian Empire